Volodymyr Zubashivskyi (born 28 February 1999) is a Ukrainian professional footballer who plays as a midfielder for FC Chernihiv in the Ukrainian First League.

Career

Early career
He started his career at RVUFK Kyiv and in the youth system of Olimpik Donetsk. In 2018 he moved to Dukla Prague.

FC Chernihiv
On 23 August 2022 he signed for FC Chernihiv of the Ukrainian First League. On 27 August he made his league debut against Skoruk Tomakivka at the Yunist Stadium in Chernihiv.

Career statistics

Club

References

External links
 Volodymyr Zubashivskyi at FC Chernihiv 
 Volodymyr Zubashivskyi at upl.ua 

1999 births
Living people
Footballers from Chernihiv
Piddubny Olympic College alumni
Olympia Radotín players
Dukla Prague footballers
FC Chernihiv players
FC Kudrivka players
Ukrainian footballers
Association football midfielders
Ukrainian First League players
Czech National Football League players
Ukrainian expatriate footballers
Expatriate footballers in the Czech Republic
Ukrainian expatriate sportspeople in the Czech Republic